Tarbiat is a pedestrian street in the center of Tabriz, Iran. It was built during the Pahlavi Dynasty (the first Pahlavi) and named in memory of Tabriz's mayor Mohammad Ali Tarbiat, who was responsible for initiation of the modernization project of Tabriz. Some parts of Tarbiyat Street were passing through part of the residential complex belonging to Qajar-Batmanghelich (Shah-e-Nimrouz, the commander of the military forces stationed in Northwestern Iran) which was expropriated by Reza shah shortly after his coup against Ahmad Shah Qajar in 1925. During Mayor Darvish Zadeh incumbency (1993–1997) Tarbiyat St. was rebuilt as a pedestrian-only street.

Tarbiyat Street currently is considered one of the busiest districts in the city center of Tabriz. It includes a small part of the Tabriz Bazar, known as Shishe Gar Khane, and  some modern shopping malls: Shekh Safi, Shams-e Tabrizi, Molana, and some more. The street has a special architecture.

Gallery

See also
 Tabriz
 Nobar bath
 Ferdowsi Street
 Shahnaz street

References

External links

 Editorial Board, East Azarbaijan Geography, Iranian Ministry of Education, 2000
 http://www.eachto.ir

Tabriz
Architecture in Iran
Streets in Iran
Pedestrian malls
Tourist attractions in Tabriz
Transport in Tabriz